Samuel Opoku Nti (born January 23, 1961, in Kumasi) is a former Ghanaian football forward.

Biography 
He is generally considered to have been Ghana's top footballer in the early to mid-1980s; before the international advent of Abedi Pele. Opoku Nti featured in Ghana's victorious 1982 African cup winning side as well as the unsuccessful 1984 squad; which was eliminated in the 1st round of the competition. In the 1992 African Cup, he was controversially left on the substitutes bench for the majority of the tournament in favour of Mohammed Gargo, Stanley Aboraa, and Nii Lamptey - all of whom were considerably less experienced than Nti.

His nickname is "Zico," in honour of the Brazilian footballer and 1983 FIFA player of the year. In 1983 Opoku Nti, while playing for Asante Kotoko, finished as runner-up for the prestigious France Football African Footballer of the Year award. The African Sportswriters Association named him Africa's best player, in the same year. This was the year that Opoku Nti's match-winning goal made Asante Kotoko win the Africa Clubs Championship by beating Egypt's Al-Ahly in the final at Kumasi. It was one of the most memorable goals in Ghana soccer. In the 16th minute of the cup final, a counterattack was initiated by Kotoko's right-back Ernest Apau. Strong midfielder "Butcher" Yahya Kassum continued the attack and sent a pass to speeding right-winger John Smith Bannerman. Bannerman whisked past Al-Ahly's reliable left-back Rabi Yacin and floated a pass to the marauding Opoku Nti, who tapped the ball past a bewildered Al-Ahly goalkeeper Thabet into the net, sending the teeming Kotoko fans into a frenzy of celebration.

In 1984 Opoku Nti moved to Swiss champions Servette FC. After spending just one season with the club and falling out with the coach, Nti moved to Ottmar Hitzfeld's FC Aarau, where he spent the next three seasons, before moving to another Swiss side FC Baden. he was the manager of FC Africa n football team.

External links 
Ghanaweb article
Weltfussball entry

1961 births
Living people
Ghanaian footballers
Ghana international footballers
1982 African Cup of Nations players
1984 African Cup of Nations players
1992 African Cup of Nations players
Servette FC players
FC Aarau players
FC Baden players
Expatriate footballers in Switzerland
Asante Kotoko S.C. players
Ghanaian expatriate sportspeople in Switzerland
Africa Cup of Nations-winning players
Footballers from Kumasi
Association football forwards